Longchuan may refer to the following locations in the People's Republic of China:

Longchuan County, Guangdong (龙川县), of Heyuan City
Longchuan County, Yunnan (陇川县), of Dehong Prefecture
Longchuan, Baise (龙川镇), town in Youjiang District, Baise, Guangxi
Longchuan, Nanhua County (龙川镇), town in Nanhua County, Yunnan

See also
Longquan, Zhejiang, Lung-ch'üan in Wade–Giles